Archos (stylized as ARCHOS) is a French multinational electronics company that was established in 1988 by Henri Crohas. Archos manufactures tablets, smartphones, portable media players and portable data storage devices. The name is an anagram of Crohas' last name. Also, in Greek (-αρχος), it's a suffix used in nouns indicating a person with power. The company's slogan has been updated from "Think Smaller" to "On The Go", and the current "Entertainment your way".

Archos has developed a variety of products, including digital audio players, portable video players (PVP), digital video recorders, a personal digital assistant, netbooks, more recently tablet computers using Google Android and Microsoft Windows (tablet PCs), and smartphones (which are manufactured by ZTE under the "Archos" brand name).

Success and decline 
By the year 2000, Archos became an important player in the portable media player market and this was demonstrated by the groundbreaking year 2000 release of the very first disk-based digital audio player (DAP) called Jukebox 6000. This product paved the way for the high-capacity DAPs, which finally resulted in the wide adoption of digital and MP3 players. Archos' success during this period was attributed to its strategy of technological leadership, releasing different iterations of a product line, which featured a succession of products with better specifications and technology than their predecessors.

In the latter part of the 2000s, Archos began to lose to Apple, which - for its part - introduced its own portable devices such as the iPod. This development highlighted a trend in the technology industry where beating competitors to the market and equipping products with the most advanced technology available do not always translate to success. The company started phasing its portable media players in 2008 to focus more on its Android tablet range.

In 2013, the company entered the mobile phone market by launching a series of smartphone models for instance, Archos Cesium, Archos Diamond, Archos Titanium, Archos Platinum, Archos Neon, Archos Xenon, Archos Oxygen and Archos Helium.

Products

Handheld and portable computers with x86 compatible processors

Archos 9 PC Tablet 
The Archos 9 PC Tablet is a 9" tablet computer launched October 22, 2009 and contains Microsoft's Windows 7 operating system.

Archos 133 PC 13.3" netbook 
The Archos 133 PC is a notebook computer with a 13.3" screen. Intel Atom D510 Dual Core, 1 GB 667/800 MHz, Webcam, Windows 7.

Handheld computers with ARM compatible processors

Generation 7

Archos 5 Internet tablet 
In September 2009 Archos announced the Archos 5 Internet tablet.

Being an extension of the Archos 5, this internet tablet uses Google's Android mobile operating system.

Specifications:
Processor based on ARM Cortex-A8, 32 bit, dual-issue, superscalar core @ 800 MHz 65 nm
256 MB of RAM
4.8" display, 800x480 resolution
Video playback
Music playback
Storage: 8 or 32 GB flash memory + microSD slot (SDHC compatible) or 160-500 GB with 2.5" hard drive (ext3 file-system)
Built in GPS
Bluetooth 2.0
FM radio

Archos 7 home tablet series 
The home tablet series includes  tablets that utilizes Google's Android mobile operating system.

All versions:
 7" display, 800x480 resolution
 Video Playback
 Music Playback
 WIFI 802.11g
 Storage: microSD slot support up to 32 GB cards

Archos 8 home tablet 
The Archos 8 home tablet is a device that resembles a digital photo frame but is actually a full featured computer system that comes with an 8" touch screen with a resolution of 800x600 pixels.

Generation 8 

On August 31, 2010 Archos announced its eighth generation of tablets. The five tablets were supposed to be launched with Android 2.2 Froyo along with a hold-over release of the Archos 5 without its GPS. Froyo was not released until sometime around December, due to numerous delays with the Archos firmware development team.

Arnova series 
Under the new brandname Arnova, in 2011 Archos released a series of low cost Android tablets for the mass consumer market.  They are priced at 100 Euro to 200 Euro (in the U.S. $99 to $199). Current models have resistive touch screens, and uses the RK2818 Rockchip SoC. All versions have Wi-Fi (802.11 b/g). All currently come with the AppsLib application store. The official Android Market is not included out of box, but the Arnova devices may easily be rooted, and the Android Market is commonly installed by Arnova owners.

 Arnova 7 (7" resistive screen, Android 2.2 tablet)
 Arnova 8 (8" resistive screen, ARM9 600 MHz RK2818, Android 2.1 tablet)
 Arnova 8.4 (8.4" resistive screen, Android 2.1 tablet) – configuration is aimed at those who wish to use their tablet primarily as an e-book reader.
 Arnova 10 (10.1" resistive screen, ARM9 600 MHz RK2818, Android 2.1 tablet)

There are also 2 new generation Arnovas in the market. The main changes are:

G2 series 7 and 10
OS: Android 2.3
Soc: RockChip Rk2918 has Cortex A8 CPU runs at 1 GHz.
Memory: 512 MB DDR2.
Storage: 4-8 GB Extendable via micro SDHC Slot
Screen: 7" and 10" LCD screen 1024*600 (10 inch) and 800*480 (7 inch)
Touch interface: 2 point capactive multi-touch

And the second version has also c prefix, specification are different from normal Arnova 7 G2
OS: Android 2.3
SoC: Qualcomm MSM7227
Memory: 256-512? MB
Storage: None internal, shipped with 4 GB microSDHC
Built in GPS ( Normal version G2 does not have this option )
Limited video and audio format support.

Generation 9 
Archos announced in 2011 that it would release a $199 Honeycomb tablet. The G9 tablets are powered by the TI OMAP4 series of SoCs, using the 4430 and 4460 variants at 1 GHz, 1.2 GHz, or 1.5 GHz and are equipped with either 512 MB or 1 GB RAM.  They have 8 GB or 16 GB of flash memory, and a microSDHC slot or a 250 GB hard drive. The earliest releases of these tablets utilized Android 3.0 and are upgradable to Android 4.0.3.  All have official access to Google Play. Connectivity includes WiFi (802.11 b/g/n), Bluetooth 2.1 + EDR, and GPS and are upgradable to 3G using an Archos G9 3G stick.

Generation 10 
Archos launched a new series of tablets, under the Name Gen 10 XS.

Digital camcorders, audio/video players and PDAs

Vision Line 
Archos introduced their Vision line in 2009.

Archos 24 Vision
The Archos 24 is a pocket size MP3 player. The Archos 24 vision is a stylish music player, with a 2.4" color screen for photos. The Archos 24 vision features 8 GB of storage, with room for up to 4,000 songs. It has a built-in FM radio.

Archos 3 Vision
The Larger Archos 3 Vision sports a 3" touchscreen and can play back MP3, WMA, AVI, FLV and JPEG. It stores up to 4000 songs and dozens of movies. It has voice and FM radio recording functions and an FM transmitter which allows wireless streaming music from your Archos 3 Vision to an FM radio sources, such as car radios or home HiFi (available in 8 GB only).

Technical specifications:
Internal storage: 8 GB*
Compatibility: Windows or Mac and Linux (with mass storage support)
Computer interface: USB 2.0 High Speed
Display: 3" Color LCD touch-screen – 400x240 pixels
Battery: 14 hours music, 4 hours video
Music Playback3: MP3, WMA (non protected files), WAV, OGG, FLAC
Photo Playback4: JPEG, BMP, GIF
Recorder: records from a microphone, or FM radio
Other applications: adjustable sound equalizer, multi-language Interface, stopwatch, calendar
Other file formats: reads text files (.TXT) & lyrics files (.LRC)
Physical dimensions: 95mm x 52mm x 9mm, Weight: 63 grams
Package includes: Archos 3 Media Player, USB Cable (for charging and file transfer), earphones and user manual
Features: clock, calendar, FM recording, lyrics display
Display: 3 in, color touchscreen
Video playback formats: RM, AVI, FLV, WMV, RMVB, MPEG-1, MPEG-2, MPEG-4

Archos 3cam Vision
The Archos 3cam Vision is a media player with features similar to the 3 vision. It adds an integrated camera for recording video and taking pictures.

Archos 43 Vision
Released on 3/5/2010, The Archos 43 Vision is a video media player with a 4.3" touch screen display, 8 GB of storage capacity and 30 hours of battery life. The Archos 43 Vision has very slim form factor, only 10 mm and weighing only 280 g.

Archos 18 Vision
The Archos 18 Vision is an all-in-one affordable device, featuring a 1.8" color screen, black casing and 8 GB of storage. It also features an FM radio and voice recorder, as well as 12 hours of battery life.

Archos 15 Vision
The Archos 15 Vision is quite thin (only 6 mm) and light (only 18 g) with highly responsive touch keys and the 1.5 color screen that make the Archos 15 Vision very easy to use. It combines the extreme portability with the 4 GB of storage and the FM radio..

Archos 14 Vision
The new Archos 14 Vision is an ultra portable MP3 player with 1.4" color screen. Thanks to its original and unusual small design form factor and extreme light weight, the Archos 14 fits into a jean pocket. With 4 GB of storage it accommodates 2,000 songs.

Archos 1 Vision
Smaller than a credit card and lighter than a pack of gum, it has a playback time of over 20 hours and a very affordable price. It comes with 4 GB of storage space, and can display music lyrics and photos.

Archos 2 Vision
The Archos 2 Vision is a credit card-sized device with a touch area for scrolling. It comes with 8 GB or 16 GB of storage space.

FamilyPad 
Archos launched a 13.3" tablet in December 2012. Sold for €299, it was aggressively placed among the other large screen tablets (superior to 9.7").

Other 13.3" tablets  :

-Toshiba's Excite™ 13 Tablet : discontinued

In March 2013, it was quickly followed by the Familypad 2, with an improved dual core Cortex-A9 at 1.6 GHz and quadruple GPU Mali 400 (compared to the former mono Cortex-A8 at 1 GHz of the Familypad 1).

Technical specifications (for the Familypad 2) :
Display: 13.3": 1280 x 800 pixels
Application Framework: Android 4.1, "Jelly Bean"
Processor: Dual-core A9 @ 1.6 GHz and Quad-core GPU Mali 400 MP4
Capacity: 8GB + micro SD (compatible with cards up to 64GB)
RAM: 1GB
Battery life :	Video playback time: 10h / Standby: 6 days
Dimensions / weight:	• 337 mm x 230 mm x 11.6 mm (13.3 x 9.0 x 0.45'') / 1.3 kg (2.86 pounds)

Elements Series
In 2013 Archos introduced their Elements series which include Cobalt, Xenon, Carbon, Titanium, and recently the Platinum tablet line-ups. Archos has mostly been pushing to publicize the Titanium & Platinum series which they announced at CES 2013. In announcing their Titanium & Platinum series, Archos stated that each of the tablet models were made to compete against another major tablet range in the market, but at a lower price:
70 Titanium – Amazon
80 Titanium & Platinum – iPad mini
97 Titanium & Platinum – iPad 3 and iPad (4th generation)

Past products

Former Archos products since discontinued include handheld and portable computers, digital camcorders, audiovisual playback equipment, portable storage devices, and peripherals for the Amiga line.

Partnerships

Content portals 
Released along with the Generation 5 and Archos TV+ devices in 2007, the Archos Content Portal (ACP) provides video on demand purchase or rental directly to the internet enabled devices. However, there is no PC based software for the service such as iTunes. A major difference from similar services is that given "portals" are serviced by different distributors, such as CinemaNow in North America. Archos has numerous ACP partners worldwide but they vary by region.

MoovyPlay 
In the summer of 2007 French-based Cinebank announced MoovyPlay. The device runs on a kiosk to harddrive rental service with Archos building the 40GB player. The Drive attaches to a Dock similar to those seen in Archos players and connects to a Video Display. The device was launched in France on December 10, 2007 with initial success.

PocketDish 
DISH Network Corporation, which owns 19% of Archos since 2005, sold Archos PVPs under the PocketDish brand. There were three versions, the AV700E (AV700), AV500 (AV500), and the AV402E (Gmini 402). While the original products are no longer available, on December 18, 2007 Dish Network released info on a new similar deal with the current generation 605 and 705 Wi-Fi, allowing high speed transfers to the devices from their current HD receivers. Unlike with the original PocketDish, the products will not be sold a Dish rebranding, instead the software plug-in was made available for free for the two products. They are expected to be sold alongside Dish products in January. In 2008 Dish Network's PocketDish page was updated to show the new service and products.

American Airlines 
In May 2007, American Airlines revealed plans of offering modified Archos 604 and 704s to first-class passengers for entertainment during their flight.

Opera 
Opera Software has provided the web browser for Archos devices since the PMA400. They are a version of Opera for devices similar to that seen on the Wii video game console and the Nokia N800 Internet appliance. On Generation 5 devices Adobe Flash support was added. An update to full Flash 9 support was announced in April 2008 from the current Flash 7.

SFR 
In late 2007, SFR, a French mobile phone company, announced to be building a new device with Archos that utilizes 3G communication. It was revealed to be the Archos 5g. The Archos 5g is currently available for a discounted price through SFR for a service contract.

Blockbuster 
A similar deal to the one with Cinebank was announced with Blockbuster Inc. in 2008. The specifics were revealed and Blockbuster hinted that the service will not be Archos exclusive.

Latest products 
In 2018, Archos introduced a slew of products to the market. The most notable of these involved the product unveiled in February, which was the very first Android-powered scooter called Citee Connect. Several weeks later, the company announced the Archos Hello, which is touted as an A.I.-powered smart display to challenge the likes of Amazon Echo. The Saphir 50X joined these gadgets in April 2018. This new release was an update to the Archos 50 Saphir, the tech company's rugged phone brand.

Archos announced the launch of the X67 5G smartphone in 2021. The manufacturer is offering this mobile device with 6.67 inches display, Mediatek Dimensity 800 MT6873 chipset, 8 GB of RAM and 128 GB of internal storage.

Perspectives of the Group 
Faced with increased competition from China, Archos has decided since 2019 to make a profound change in its economic model. It is now deploying its strategy and its organization in the professions of the future, where services and innovation are at the heart of the activity.

See also 

 Portable media player
 Tablet computer
Arceus

References

External links 

Mobile phone manufacturers
Computer hardware companies
Telecommunications companies of France
Multinational companies headquartered in France
Portable audio player manufacturers
Digital audio players
Portable media players
Audio equipment manufacturers of France
French brands
Consumer electronics brands
Companies based in Paris-Saclay
Companies listed on Euronext Paris
Computer companies of France